2019 Dhaka fire may refer to:

February 2019 Dhaka fire
FR Tower fire, in March 2019